Kingstreet Investments Ltd v New Brunswick [2007] 1 SCR 3 is a Canadian unjust enrichment case, concerning to what extent enrichment of the defendant must be at the expense of the claimant.

Facts
Kingstreet Investments ran licensed nightclubs in New Brunswick. They bought alcohol from provincial retailers, paying a user charge on top of the retail price as regulation prescribed. They claimed the user charge was unconstitutional and sought relief with compound interest.

The Queen's Bench held the user charge was an unconstitutional indirect tax, but denied recovery because Kingstreet had passed the burden on in increased prices. There was a passing on defence. Moreover, ultra vires taxes cannot generally be recovered. Robertson JA for the Court of Appeal held by a majority that restitution should be made for money from the time of legal proceedings, as that was the start of the protest. Before then, the passing on defence applied.

Judgment
Bastarache J for the Supreme Court, because unjust enrichment principles are ill-suited to determine constitutional issues of ultra vires taxes, that is the wrong approach. There should be a remedy as of constitutional right. When governments collect taxes ultra vires it undermines the rule of law. So there must be a right to restitution. Parliament can prevent fiscal chaos by suspending declarations of invalidity and enacting valid taxes and applying them retroactively. The passing on defence is inconsistent with restitution law, it confuses compensation matters, and is not concerned with the possibility that the claimant may receive a windfall. It is economically misconceived and creates difficulties of proof. There is no need to consider the counter arguments to passing on, of protest and compulsion. The six year limitation in the New Brunswick Limitation of Actions Act s 9 applied. There was no right to compound interest, which might be warranted to express a moral sanction.

See also

English unjust enrichment law

Notes

References

Supreme Court of Canada cases
2007 in Canadian case law
Unjust enrichment